Gornje Crniljevo is a village located in Osečina Municipality, Kolubara District, Serbia.

Gallery

References

Villages in Serbia
Populated places in Kolubara District